Pultenaea aristata, commonly known as bearded bush-pea or prickly bush-pea, is a species of flowering plant in the family Fabaceae and is endemic to New South Wales. It is a small, erect shrub with linear to narrow elliptic, sharp-tipped leaves, and yellow and red flowers.

Description
The upper and lower surfaces a similar shade of green and are covered with small pimples. The flowers are densely crowded at the ends of the branchlets with overlapping bracts at the base. Flowering occurs between September and October and the fruit is an oval pod.

Taxonomy and naming
Pultenaea aristata was first formally described in 1825 by Augustin Pyramus de Candolle in his Prodromus Systematis Naturalis Regni Vegetabilis from an unpublished description by Franz Sieber. The specific epithet (aristata) means "awned".

Distribution and habitat
Bearded bush-pea grows in woodland and heath on sandstone, from the southern suburbs of Sydney to Mount Keira near Wollongong.

Conservation status
This pultenaea is classified as "vulnerable" under the Australian Government Environment Protection and Biodiversity Conservation Act 1999 and the New South Wales Government Biodiversity Conservation Act 2016. The main threats to the species include inappropriate fire regimes, understorey clearing and road widening and maintenance.

References

aristata
Flora of New South Wales
Plants described in 1825
Taxa named by Augustin Pyramus de Candolle